Quokkapox virus (QPV), also known as quokka poxvirus, marsupial papillomavirus, or marsupialpox virus, is a dsDNA virus that causes quokkapox. It is unclear whether this virus is its own species or a member of another species. It primarily infects the quokka, which is one of only four macropodid marsupials to get pox lesions.

Because the quokka host primarily lives on isolated islands in Western Australia, the range of the virus is limited as well.  It was first described in 1972 from samples taken on Rottnest Island.

References

External links
 

Poxviruses
Chordopoxvirinae
Animal viral diseases
Virus-related cutaneous conditions
Species described in 1972
Infraspecific virus taxa
Marsupial diseases